The Wabash Cannonball is an American folk song about a fictional train.

Wabash Cannonball may also refer to:
Wabash Cannon Ball, a Wabash Railroad (later Norfolk & Western) passenger train routing between Detroit and St Louis, named for the song
Wabash Cannonball, a steel corkscrew roller coaster at the Opryland USA theme park 
Wabash Cannonball, an album produced in 1977 by the National Geographic Society
Wabash Cannonball Trail, a rail to trail conversion in northwest Ohio